The New Avengers is a team originally formed due to a mass break-out at the super villain prison The Raft. The team then became a splinter group of Avengers that chose not to comply with federal superhuman registration, as opposed to the government-sanctioned team gathered in Mighty Avengers, which itself was supplanted by a different government-sanctioned team in the series Dark Avengers. The team was reformed in June 2010 as part of the "Heroic Age" story line.

New Avengers (2005-2012)

Founders

Post-Civil War recruits (2007)
The Avengers team featured in the New Avengers comic book, created from the remaining anti-registration Secret Avengers during the Civil War, with Luke Cage, Spider-Man, Wolverine, Echo, and "Spider-Woman" continuing from the original New Avengers team.

Post-Secret Invasion recruits (2009)

Heroic Age (2010)

New Avengers in the aftermath of the Siege.

Fear Itself (2011)

New Avengers (2013-2015)
The relaunched title doesn't feature the Avengers but the Illuminati. 
For members see under Illuminati

Time Runs Out (2015-present)
Following an eight-month ellipsis, Sunspot assembles a new unit of New Avengers to help end the conflict between the Avengers and the Illuminati.

All-New All-Different Marvel (2015-present)
After the All-New All-Different rebrand, Sunspot took control of A.I.M., and changed the name to Avengers Idea Mechanics. The team is established in a new volume of New Avengers written by Al Ewing.

References

Lists of Marvel Comics characters by organization
Lists of Avengers (comics) characters